The following lists events from 2013 in Malta.

Incumbents
President: George Abela
Prime Minister: Lawrence Gonzi (until March 11), Joseph Muscat (starting March 11)

Events

March 
 9 March – Maltese general election, 2013, with a turnout of 93%. Joseph Muscat defeated Lawrence Gonzi in the election.

April 
 6 April – a new inauguration took place which initiated new members of the parliament of Malta.

September 
 26–29 September – The 2013 Battle of Malta; Louis Catarius won the tournament.

See also
Malta in the Eurovision Song Contest 2013
2012–13 Maltese Premier League
2012–13 Maltese FA Trophy
Public holidays in Malta
Summary of the 9 March 2013 House of Representatives of Malta election results
2013 films shot in Malta

References

External links
Malta Events - Full Calendar of Events in Malta|Visit Malta

 
Years of the 21st century in Malta
Malta